Mukhran Vakhtangadze (born January 22, 1973 in Batumi) is a Georgian wrestler who competed in the Men's Freestyle 85 kg at the 2000 Summer Olympics and won the bronze medal. He also competed in the 2004 Summer Olympics, but was eliminated early.

Vakhtangadze won the World Championship in 2001. He has been a scholarship holder with the Olympic Solidarity program since February 2003.

References
sports-reference

External links
 

1973 births
Living people
Wrestlers at the 2000 Summer Olympics
Male sport wrestlers from Georgia (country)
Wrestlers at the 2004 Summer Olympics
Olympic wrestlers of Georgia (country)
Olympic bronze medalists for Georgia (country)
Olympic medalists in wrestling
World Wrestling Championships medalists
Medalists at the 2000 Summer Olympics